This is a list of football clubs in the Faroe Islands.

Football clubs in the Faroe Islands 

There are 18 clubs at the moment, competing in 4 different leagues in the Faroes:

 AB
 B36
 B68
 B71
 EB/Streymur
 FC Hoyvík (second incarnation; established in 2012)
 FC Suðuroy
 HB
 ÍF
 KÍ
 MB
 NSÍ
 Royn
 Skála
 TB
 Undrið FF
 07 Vestur
 Víkingur Gøta

Dissolved clubs 

This is the list of clubs that are either no longer in existence, changed their name or have merged with another club.

There are 15 clubs on this list:

 GÍ Gøta
 LÍF Leirvik
 FC Hoyvík (first incarnation; merged with FF Giza in 2012 to form Giza/Hoyvík, known as ÍF Fram Tórshavn from 1975 to 2008)
 FF Giza (known as NÍF Nólsoy from 1968 to 2010)
 EB Eiði
 Kaldbaks Bóltfelag
 SÍ Sumba
 Skansin Tórshavn
 Bóltfelagið Đriv
 Stranda Bóltfelag
 Streymur Hvalvik
 Æsir Vestmanna
 FS Vágar
 VB Vágur
 VB/Sumba

Other 

This is the list of clubs that no longer operate in adult football, but participate at youth levels.

 SÍ Sørvágur
 SÍF Sandavágur

Notes 

All clubs in the Faroe Islands have second and third teams, that are competing in lower divisions of the Faroese football pyramid.

External links
 List of football stadiums on the Faroe Islands - Nordic Stadiums

Faroe
Football clubs
Football clubs in the Faroe Islands
Football clubs